Lhade Namloyak (1970) is a Tibetan-Australian poet.

Biography
Lhade Namloyak was born in Tangnaigai Township of Xinghai County, Qinghai in 1970, during the Cultural Revolution. He attended Xinghai County Minzu Middle School. In 1989 he was accepted to Qinghai Normal University and graduated in 1992. After graduation, he was assigned to the Bureau of Education of Xinghai County. He started to publish works in 1989. On May 9, 1993, he was arrested by the National Security Agency. He was sentenced to four years imprisonment for the crime of splitting the state. On November 14, 1997, he was released from prison. In March 1999 he was in exile in India.

From May 1, 1999 to March 31, 2005, Lhade Namloyak worked in the Central Tibetan Administration as a researcher. On May 14, 2007, he pursued advanced studies in Australia.

In October 2013, Lhade Namloyak published a book with Yuan Hongbing in Taipei, Taiwan on the death of the 10th Panchen Lama. The book claims Panchen was murdered by the Chinese Communist Party. It alleges that Deng Xiaoping and other senior members of the Communist Party, took the decision to murder by poisoning the 10th Panchen Lama, and under the leadership of Hu Jintao and Wen Jiabao, the implementation of Meng Hongwei, Hu Chunhua and Zhou Meizhen.

Works
 Poetry And Prison
 Nights of Snow on fire
 Truth for Promotion of Peaceful Talks—Follow-up Recording of the 3rd China Trip of Special Envoy of Dalai Lama
 Review of Tibetan's Opinions
 The Poetry in Name of Tibet(Collective Tibetan translation)
 Research for Sangdhor
 An in-depth perspective of Tibetan self-immolation-The origin and development of Tibetan self-immolation protest movement
 Assassination of the Buddha——The Truth of the Death of His Holiness the 10th Panchen Lama (Co-author: Yuan Hongbing)
 An Introduction to History of International Tibetology
 TIBET Restoring State VS Colonial 'Autonomic(1951-2021) October of 2021 in Taiwan

References

1970 births
People from Hainan Prefecture
Living people
Tibetan poets
Qinghai Normal University alumni
Writers from Qinghai